The Fallen Paramedics Memorial is a monument commemorating paramedics who have died in the line of duty, installed in Victoria, British Columbia. The memorial was unveiled on May 6, 2015. It is located in the BC Emergency Services Garden of Honour, south of the Legislative Buildings.

References

External links

 

2015 establishments in British Columbia
Monuments and memorials in British Columbia
Outdoor sculptures in Victoria, British Columbia
2015 sculptures